Figure skating at the 1994 Goodwill Games took place in Saint Petersburg, Russia at the Yubileyny Sports Palace. Medals were awarded in the disciplines of men's singles, ladies' singles, pair skating, and ice dancing. The event, held in August 1994, was delayed by a day after a heat wave, a power outage and lack of air conditioning resulted in the ice not being ready.

Results

Men

Ladies

Pairs

Ice dancing

References

External links
 Results
 1994 Goodwill Games

Goodwill Games
International figure skating competitions hosted by Russia
1994 Goodwill Games
1994